Kanatsiohareke (Gah-nah-jo-ha-lay-gay)  is a small Mohawk/Kanienkahaka community on the north bank of the Mohawk River, west of Fonda, New York. The name means "The clean pots" and is derived from Canajoharie or "Upper Castle", one of the two major towns of the Mohawk nation in 1738. Kanatsiohareke was created to be a "Carlisle Indian Boarding School in Reverse", teaching Mohawk language and culture. Located at the ancient homeland of the Kanienkehaka (Mohawk), it was re-established in September 1993 under the leadership of Thomas R. Porter (Sakokwenionkwas-"The One Who Wins").  The community must raise their own revenue and frequently hold cultural presentations, workshops, and academic events, including an annual Strawberry Festival.  A craft shop on site features genuine handmade Native crafts from all over Turtle Island (North America).

The primary mission of the community is to try to preserve traditional values, culture, language and lifestyles in the guidance of the Kaienerekowa (Great Law of Peace).  Kanatsiohareke, Inc. is a non-profit organization under IRS code 501c3.

Thomas Porter is a member of the Bear Clan of the Mohawk Nation at Akwesasne.  (Akwesasne, also known as the St. Regis Mohawk Reservation, straddles the Canada–US border near Massena, New York.)  He is married to Alice Joe Porter who is Choctaw, and has six children.

References

External links 
 Kanatsiohareke Mohawk Community Official Website
 Photose of 19th annual Strawberry Festival, from The Daily Gazette

Intentional communities in the United States
Iroquois populated places
Montgomery County, New York
Mohawk tribe
Native American organizations
Non-profit organizations based in New York (state)
Organizations established in 1993
Native American language revitalization